Gianfranco Barra (born 5 April 1940) is an Italian film, television and stage actor. He has appeared in more than 80 films. Born in Rome, Barra studied at the Silvio d’Amico Academy of Dramatic Arts in his hometown. First active on stage, he made his film debut in 1968. He is also active on television, in commercials, and as a playwright.

Selected filmography

 Avanti! (1972)
 The Seduction of Mimi (1972)
 Dirty Weekend (1973)
 Bread and Chocolate (1973)
 Black Holiday (1973)
 Policewoman (1974)
 Il lumacone (1974)
 Playing the Field (1974)
 The Mazurka of the Baron, the Saint and the Early Fig Tree (1975)
 La polizia accusa: il Servizio Segreto uccide (1975)
 The Suspicious Death of a Minor (1975)
 La professoressa di scienze naturali (1976)
 Double Murder (1977)
 The Virgo, the Taurus and the Capricorn (1977)
 I nuovi mostri (1977)
 L'altra metà del cielo (1977)
 Goodnight, Ladies and Gentlemen (1978)
 A Policewoman on the Porno Squad (1979)
 Sugar, Honey and Pepper (1980)
 Prickly Pears (1981)
 Banana Joe (1982)
 Scorpion with Two Tails (1982)
 Eccezzziunale... veramente (1982)
 Sapore di mare 2 (1983)
 Zero in condotta (1983)
 It's Happening Tomorrow (1988)
 What if Gargiulo Finds Out? (1988)
 The Gamble (1988)
 The Invisible Wall (1991)
  Flight of the Innocent (1992)
 Acquitted for Having Committed the Deed (1992)
 Giovanni Falcone (1993)
 Screw Loose (1999)
 The Jokes (2004)
 A Dinner for Them to Meet (2007)

References

External links

1940 births
Living people
Italian male film actors
Italian male television actors
Italian male stage actors
Male actors from Rome
Accademia Nazionale di Arte Drammatica Silvio D'Amico alumni
20th-century Italian male actors